The Empire Never Ended is the fourth full-length studio album by Desmadrados Soldados de Ventura, released in November 2014 by Golden Lab Records.

Track listing

Personnel
Adapted from The Empire Never Ended liner notes.

Desmadrados Soldados de Ventura
 David Birchall – bass guitar
 Andrew Cheetham – drums
 Dylan Hughes – electric guitar
 Nick Mitchell – electric guitar
 Alex Pierce – congas
 Tom Settle – electric guitar
 Edwin Stevens – electric guitar

Production and additional personnel
 Patrick Crane – recording

Release history

References

External links 
 The Empire Never Ended at Bandcamp

2014 albums
Desmadrados Soldados de Ventura albums